Stapfiella zambesiensis is a shrub native to Zambia, Africa. It is found east  of Kasama.

S. zambesiensis grows up to 2 meters tall, yellow antrorse hairs on pubescent leaves, white homostylous raceme flowers, and "yellowish-brown" seeds.

Varieties 
Currently, there are two accepted varrities of S. zambesiensis; var. grandifolia and var. zambesiensis. Variety grandifolia may be an ecological form; it is found in the margins of swamp forests.

As of 1994, both varieties are classified as least concerned.

References 

Flora of Zambia
Plants described in 1975
Passifloraceae